Almon Heath Read (June 12, 1790 – June 3, 1844) was an American politician who served as a Democratic member of the U.S. House of Representatives for Pennsylvania's 17th congressional district from 1842 to 1843 and Pennsylvania's 12th congressional district from 1843 to 1844.  He served in both houses of the Pennsylvania legislature and as Pennsylvania State Treasurer.

Early life and education
Read was born in Shelburne, Vermont.  He graduated from Williams College in Williamstown, Massachusetts in 1811.  He served as county clerk from 1815 to 1820.  He studied law, was admitted to the bar in 1816 and commenced practice in Montrose, Pennsylvania.

Career
He was a member of the Pennsylvania House of Representatives from 1827 to 1832.  He served in the Pennsylvania State Senate for the 11th district from 1833 to 1837 and as Pennsylvania State Treasurer from 1840 to 1841.

Read was elected as a Democrat to the Twenty-seventh Congress to fill the vacancy caused by the death of Davis Dimock, Jr.  He was reelected to the Twenty-eighth Congress and served until his death in Montrose in 1844.  Interment in Montrose Cemetery.

See also
List of United States Congress members who died in office (1790–1899)

Notes

Sources

The Political Graveyard

|-

|-

1790 births
1844 deaths
19th-century American politicians
Burials in Pennsylvania
Democratic Party members of the United States House of Representatives from Pennsylvania
Democratic Party members of the Pennsylvania House of Representatives
Pennsylvania lawyers
Democratic Party Pennsylvania state senators
People from Shelburne, Vermont
People from the Scranton–Wilkes-Barre metropolitan area
State treasurers of Pennsylvania
Williams College alumni
19th-century American lawyers